Thomas Peacock was an English professional footballer who made over 100 appearances in the Football League for Nottingham Forest as an inside left.

Personal life 
Peacock attended Tupton Hall School and the University of Nottingham and trained to be a teacher. He began his teaching career in Somerset and following his football career, he became headmaster of St Edmunds C of E Primary School in Mansfield Woodhouse.

Career statistics

References

1912 births
Year of death missing
People from North East Derbyshire District
People from Mansfield Woodhouse
Footballers from Nottinghamshire
Footballers from Derbyshire
English footballers
Association football inside forwards
English Football League players
Southern Football League players
Bath City F.C. players
Matlock Town F.C. players
Nottingham Forest F.C. players
Chelsea F.C. wartime guest players
Brentford F.C. wartime guest players
Schoolteachers from Derbyshire
Alumni of the University of Nottingham